The Ligier JS25 was a Formula One car designed by Michel Beaujon and Claude Galopin for use by the Ligier team during the 1985 Formula One season. Drivers of the car were initially their  driver Andrea de Cesaris and veteran Jacques Laffite who returned to the team after two fruitless years at Williams, but after a series of crashes, de Cesaris was fired by team boss Guy Ligier and replaced by Philippe Streiff.

Using the JS25, the French team were able to score 23 points in 1985 and finished 6th in the Constructors Championship. Laffite was able to score two 3rd-place finishes and also a 2nd place at the season ending Australian Grand Prix where team mate Streiff also managed to finish 3rd, although his efforts to take 2nd from Laffite almost cause both cars to not finish the race. Streiff made contact with Laffite on the penultimate lap of the race and drove the last with his left front wheel almost off the car.

Easily the most spectacular moment for the JS25 came at the Austrian Grand Prix when de Cesaris (aptly nicknamed "de Crasheris") destroyed his car in a high-speed rollover on lap 14. The team had not yet seen the accident on the television monitors when de Cesaris returned to the pits and he merely told them that the car had stalled and could not restart it, causing the team to be shocked when they finally saw the crash on replay. It was after this event that team owner Guy Ligier decided he could no longer afford the repair bills for de Cesaris's frequent crashes, stating "I can no longer afford to employ this man" (this was despite the Italian's personal sponsor Marlboro paying the bulk of his salary). He was replaced by Streiff after the next race in the Netherlands.

Ironically, Streiff was almost the cause of the team missing out on what would prove to be their best result of the season. In the final race of the season in Australia, Laffite and Streiff were headed for a safe 2nd and 3rd respectively behind race winner Keke Rosberg's Williams-Honda. On the penultimate lap, Streiff tried to overtake his team-mate for second place with almost disastrous results as the two cars collided. As a result, Streiff's front wheel axle was severely damaged. While Laffite carried on in second, Streiff managed to limp his JS25 home and retain third place despite only have three wheels firmly attached to the car, with the front left wheel bouncing up and down over the course of the last lap, but somehow remaining attached to the car. It would remain a career best finish for Streiff. Guy Ligier, not impressed that Streiff had almost taken out both team cars at the end of the race when they were both assured of a podium finish, would not offer the Frenchman a drive for 1986 as a result.

The JS25 was replaced for the  season by the Ligier JS27.

Complete Formula One World Championship results
(key) (results in italics indicate fastest lap)

 Équipe Ligier boycotted the 1985 South African Grand Prix due to mounting international pressures against tolerating the country's system of apartheid. Ligier's boycott was in lockstep with the French government's boycott and sanctioning of South Africa

References

External links
Ligier JS25 at Chicane F1
Ligier JS25 at the Formula One DataBase
Video of Andrea de Cesaris's crash at the Austrian Grand Prix.

1985 Formula One season cars
Ligier Formula One cars